Jean Fan is an American biomedical engineer. She won a Nature Research Award for Inspiring Women.

Life 
She graduated from Johns Hopkins University, where she studied with Rachel Karchin, and Harvard University.

She teaches at The Innovation Institute. She was the founder of cuSTEMized. She teaches at Johns Hopkins University.

References

External links 

 Working Scientist podcast: How to inspire young women to consider scientific careers (nature.com)
Do Art Like a Science, Do Science Like an Art | Jean Fan | TEDxJHU

American biomedical engineers
Johns Hopkins University alumni
Johns Hopkins University faculty
American women engineers
Harvard Medical School alumni
American women academics
Year of birth missing (living people)
Living people
21st-century American women